Granada Hills Charter (often abbreviated to GHCHS/GHC or simply Granada) is an independent charter school consisting of over 4,600 students in grades K–12, located in the Granada Hills neighborhood of Los Angeles, California, United States. It is the largest charter school in the nation. Granada also has a high Academic Performance Index (API) score of 878, greatly exceeding the target API score of 800 for all schools in California. On April 12, 2011, Granada was named a 2011 California Distinguished School. On December 22, 2011, Granada became an International Baccalaureate World School. Since 2011, the school has won seven National Academic Decathlon Championships.

History
Granada Hills High School is a comprehensive public high school, founded in 1960. Bryce Schurr was the first acting principal of the school. It was in the Los Angeles City High School District until 1961, when it merged into LAUSD.

In the 1970–71 and 1971-72 school years, Granada Hills High had the largest student body of any high school in the United States. Overcrowding at the school was relieved with the 1971 opening of John F. Kennedy High School.

In 1994, the school opened a LAUSD magnet school with emphasis in math, science and technology in conjunction with the California State University, Northridge. In 2003, the school was awarded charter status which granted it fiscal and instructional autonomy.

In 2003, the Los Angeles Board of Education voted to allow the school to become a charter, making it the largest school in the United States to convert to a charter school. The school administration asked for a charter status since being directly operated the district limited its fundraising opportunities, and it also was against LAUSD funding cuts.

In mid-2013, Granada Hills Charter High School purchased the nearby Pinecrest Northridge Elementary School campus for $5.6M, using funds obtained from the American Recovery and Reinvestment Act of 2009. Granada Hills Charter High School used this new land to create iGranada, a campus specializing in digital arts and sciences. This campus opened for the first time for the Fall 2015 school year.

As part of their Charter Renewal Petition, GHCHS has applied to increase their enrollment from 4,300 students up to 5,500 students. This includes adding approximately 200 additional grades 9-12 seats to the existing GHCHS campus, through a Charter Augmentation Grant, and adding up to 1,000 additional seats at the Pinecrest site (or at another possible property acquisition).

In 2020 the grade span changed to K12.

Technology 
On campus, there are six computer labs, each with more than 35 computers. There are also laptop carts, which house many laptop computers and can be transported around the campus for enrichment activities. Science classrooms are updated with new lab technology often. Most classrooms have Smart Boards and projectors, increasing the overall student interaction in class.

Beginning in the 2015–2016 school year, Chromebooks are given to every student. Teachers may use Google Classroom to post assignments, online teaching materials, and give instant feedback to the students. Additionally, the school has wifi networks campuswide, and can provide wifi at a student's home if they cannot afford it.

Demographics

According to U.S. News & World Report, as of 2019, 75% of Granada's student body is "minority," with 47% of the student body coming from an economically disadvantaged household, determined by student eligibility for California's Reduced-price meal program.

The school is accredited by the Western Association of Schools and Colleges.

Facilities 
The school's sports stadium, John Elway Stadium, is used by the Los Angeles Rampage women's soccer team and is the former home ground of the San Fernando Valley Quakes United Soccer League Premier Development League soccer team.

Academics
Granada offers 29 Advanced Placement (AP) courses and 38 IB courses which include: AP Biology, AP Chemistry, AP Physics 1, AP Physics 2, AP Physics C, AP Environmental Science, AP Computer Science A, AP Computer Science Principles, AP Statistics, AP Calculus AB, AP Calculus BC, AP English Language and Composition, AP English Literature, AP European History, AP World History, AP United States History, AP Psychology, AP United States Government, AP Macroeconomics, AP Microeconomics, AP Human Geography, AP Art History, AP Music Theory, AP Studio Art, AP Chinese Language and Culture, AP French Language, AP Spanish Language and Culture, and AP Spanish Literature.

Extracurricular activities

Granada Hills Charter High School offers a wide variety of extra curricular activities which include, Associated Student Body (ASB), Yearbook, Dance Team, Cheer, Theatre, Show Choir, Honors Choir, Jazz Band, Marching Band and Color Guard, Indoor Percussion, and Orchestra. With that, the school also offers several academic teams such as Academic Decathlon, Model United Nations, DECA, Envirothon, Robotics, Science Bowl, Science Olympiad, and Speech and Debate.

Academic Decathlon

The Academic Decathlon team won back-to-back-to-back national championships in 2011, 2012 and 2013. The 2015 team began another championship streak as Granada Hills went on to win again in 2016, 2017, 2019, 2021, and 2022. Currently, Granada Hills holds the most win with nine national titles.

Model United Nations

The nationally ranked Model United Nations team at Granada Hills Charter has been recognized at various conferences across North America. During the 2017–2018 season, they won Best Small Delegation at Harvard Model UN (HMUN). In 2019, GHC Model UN won the Award of Distinction at the National High School Model United Nations (NHSMUN). GHCMUN notably hosts the Valley Regional Model United Nations (VRMUN), the first high-school Model UN conference in the San Fernando Valley.

Robotics

The school's robotics team, The Robodox, participates in both the FIRST Robotics Competition (FRC) and in the VEX Robotics Competition (VRC). The team builds robots that compete for these competitions. Students are responsible for every step of construction, from designing and manufacturing to coding and CADing. The Robotics team also helps out the local community with its outreach programs, spreading the importance of STEM Education. In 2018, the Robodox won the VRC California State competition. In 2021 the FIRST robotics portion of the team competed in Tidal Tumble winning the competition with its two alliance members 4414 and 973  In addition, the team mastered the use of machines using them to create tons of parts this season leading to the team going undefeated for over 3 matches this season due to the revolutionary design choices.

Speech & Debate

In 2017, Granada Hills Charter won 1st place in Original Advocacy at the CHSSA State Tournament, taking 14th overall. In 2011, Granada Hills Charter won the Stanford Junior Varsity LD tournament (Yellow River). It was also the 2008 CHSSA State Champion in Thematic interpretation. In 2011 the school took 13th at the CHSSA State tournament in Original Prose and Poetry.

Marching Band & Color Guard

In 2012, the Granada Hills Charter High School Marching Band was awarded a bronze medal at the 2012 SCSBOA Division 5A Field Show Championships. In 2016, the Highlander Band participated in the 2016 Bands of America St. George Regional Championships in St. George, Utah and was awarded and recognized as an SCSBOA 4A Finalist that year.

Athletics

Baseball

Ryan Braun was a four-year letterman on the Granada Hills High School baseball team, and three-year team captain and Most Valuable Player (MVP). In 2002, he batted .451 as a senior, with an OBP of .675, and broke the school record for career home runs with 25.

Basketball

Cross Country
The girls varsity Cross Country team won the City League Championship in 2021.

Football

In 1970, Granada Hills High School won the L.A. City Football Championship with the five-receiver passing attack innovated by Coach Jack Neumeier later known as the spread offense that a few years later attracted the attention of John Elway's father, Jack Elway, after the Elway family moved to Los Angeles when Jack Elway assumed the head football coaching position at California State University, Northridge.

Soccer

Notable alumni
 Ariane Andrew, professional wrestler and singer
 Doug Baker, former professional baseball player, Detroit Tigers and Minnesota Twins
 Dave Baldwin, college football coach
 Valerie Bertinelli, actress
 Ryan Braun, former professional baseball player, Milwaukee Brewers, and 2011 Major League Baseball MVP
 Jamal Brooks, former professional football player, Dallas Cowboys and St. Louis Rams
 John Elway, former professional football player, Denver Broncos and member of Pro Football Hall of Fame
 Robert Englund, actor 
 Travis Kalanick, co-founder of Uber
 Barry Kerzin, professor of medicine and Buddhist monk
 Kameron Loe, former professional baseball player
Hana Mae Lee, comedian and actress
 Gary Matthews Jr., former professional baseball player
 Blanchard Montgomery, former professional football player, San Francisco 49ers
Michael Morhaime, videogame producer and cofounder of Blizzard Entertainment
 Jeffrey Lee Pierce, musician and author
 Dave Schmidt, former professional baseball player
 Tamlyn Tomita, actress

References

Further reading
 Charter petition 2004-2009 (Archive)
 Charter petition 2009-2014 (Archive)

External links
 

Los Angeles Unified School District schools
Granada Hills, Los Angeles
High schools in the San Fernando Valley
High schools in Los Angeles
Charter high schools in California
1961 establishments in California
Educational institutions established in 1961
Cal State Northridge Matadors men's basketball